Eduard Schlagintweit (23 March 1831 – 1866) was the third of the five Schlagintweit brothers of Munich.

Life
He wrote an account of the 1859–1860 Spanish-Moroccan War.
He was killed in the Battle of Kissingen, on 10 July 1866.

References

Attribution

External links
 

Writers from Munich
1831 births
1866 deaths
German male writers